Mehrabad (also Romanized as Mehrābād; also known as Mihrābād) is a village in Miyan Khaf Rural District, in the Central District of Khaf County, Razavi Khorasan Province, Iran. At the 2006 census, its population was 2,023, in 412 families.

References 

Populated places in Khaf County